Witold Mroziewski (born March 25, 1966) is a Polish-American prelate of the Roman Catholic Church. He has been serving as an auxiliary bishop of the Diocese of Brooklyn in New York City since 2015

Biography

Early life and priesthood 
Witold Mroziewski was born on March 25, 1966, in Augustów, Poland. He attended the John Paul II Catholic University of Lublin in Lublin, Poland, where he earned his Master of Theology degree in 1991. 

Mroziewski was ordained a priest for the Diocese of Łomża by Bishop Juliusz Paetz on June 29, 1991.  In 2001, Mroziewski moved to the United States and was incardinated, or transferred, to the Diocese of Brooklyn.

Auxiliary Bishop of Brooklyn
Mroziewski was appointed titular bishop of Walla Walla and an auxiliary bishop of the Diocese of Brooklyn on May 19, 2015, by Pope Francis. He received his episcopal consecration at the Co-Cathedral of St. Joseph in Brooklyn by Bishop Nicholas DiMarzio on July 20, 2015.

See also

 Catholic Church hierarchy
 Catholic Church in the United States
 Historical list of the Catholic bishops of the United States
 List of Catholic bishops of the United States
 Lists of patriarchs, archbishops, and bishops

References

External links
 Roman Catholic Diocese of Brooklyn Official Site

Episcopal succession

1966 births
Living people
21st-century American Roman Catholic titular bishops
Bishops appointed by Pope Francis